Leonardo Dos Reis Muñiz (born 23 January 2003) is a Spanish professional footballer who plays as a forward for  club Monza.

Club career

Youth 
Following his father's footsteps, Dos Reis began playing futsal at a young age at Polaris World Cartagena. He then switched to football, moving to Cornellà's youth academy in the 2012–13 season. Despite Barcelona showing interest in signing him to their futsal team, Dos Reis remained at Cornellà until 2014–15. He eventually joined Barcelona's youth academy in the 2015–16 season, aged 11. He was sent back on loan to Cornella in 2020–21.

On 26 January 2022, Dos Reis signed for Birmingham City, joining their Under-23s squad. His contract was extended by 12 months on 17 May. He scored scored three goals in nine games for the Under-23s in the first half of the 2021–22 season.

On 31 January 2022, Serie B side Monza purchased Dos Reis on an 18-month contract, with an option for a further year. He was integrated into Monza's Primavera 2 (under-19) squad, helping them reach the 2021–22 promotion play-offs.

Monza 
Dos Reis received his first senior call-up by Monza ahead of their Coppa Italia game against Udinese on 19 October 2022.

Style of play 
Dos Reis is a physical striker who is also noted for his technique. His main characteristics are his hold-up play, first touch and finishing.

Personal life 
Dos Reis was born in Barcelona, Spain, to Brazilian father , a professional futsal player who moved to Spain in 1995. He holds both Spanish and Brazilian citizenships.

References

External links 
 
 

2003 births
Living people
Spanish people of Brazilian descent
Sportspeople of Brazilian descent
Footballers from Barcelona
Spanish footballers
Association football forwards
FS Cartagena players
UE Cornellà players
FC Barcelona players
Birmingham City F.C. players
A.C. Monza players
Spain youth international footballers
Spanish expatriate footballers
Spanish expatriate sportspeople in England
Spanish expatriate sportspeople in Italy
Expatriate footballers in England
Expatriate footballers in Italy